The Bondmaid is 1998 novel by Catherine Lim, which tells a tragic love story of Wu, the master of a household, and Han, his maid, in 1950s Singapore.

Plot 
Sold into servitude at age of four by her own mother and treated harshly by fellow bondmaids, Han forms a bond with Wu, who is the grandson of a head housemaid.  Their friendship becomes doomed love when Wu moves to the United States, and Han find herself stuck with jealous bondmaids and Wu's relatives in Singapore.  Both face additional trials until Han's death.  The book ends when Wu and Han's son enters the household.

External links
The Bondmaid at goodreads

References

1998 novels
Novels set in the 1950s
Novels set in Singapore
Novels about slavery
Singaporean novels
Singaporean romance novels
Historical romance novels